Lindsay Elizabeth "Betsy" Stovall is an American mathematician known for her research in harmonic analysis. She is the Mary Herman Rubinstein Professor in the College of Letters & Science at the University of Wisconsin–Madison.

Education and career
Stovall is a graduate of Emory University, and received her PhD in 2009 from University of California, Berkeley, where her advisor was F. Michael Christ. Before joining the University of Wisconsin in 2012, she was associate adjunct professor at the University of California, Los Angeles.

She is the Associate Secretary for the Central Section of the American Mathematical Society, with a term beginning in February 2022.

Recognition
Stovall was named to the 2023 class of Fellows of the American Mathematical Society, "for contributions to harmonic analysis".

References

Living people
20th-century women mathematicians
21st-century women mathematicians
American women mathematicians
21st-century American women
Emory University alumni
University of California, Berkeley alumni
University of Wisconsin–Madison faculty
Year of birth missing (living people)
Fellows of the American Mathematical Society